General of Agile Cavalry was a military rank in Imperial China. The title was introduced during the reign of Emperor Wu of Han. The title was used in subsequent dynasties, sometimes as the General-in-Chief of Agile Cavalry. 

Military ranks